The 1905 Haskell Indians football team was an American football team that represented the Haskell Indian Institute (now known as Haskell Indian Nations University) as an independent during the 1905 college football season. In its first and only season under head coach Boyd Hill, Haskell compiled a 5–4–1 record and outscored opponents by a total of 102 to 78.

Schedule

References

Haskell
Haskell Indian Nations Fighting Indians football seasons
Haskell Indians football